Wrexham Grosvenor Football Club was a Welsh football club based in Wrexham, who played in the Welsh Cup in the 1879–80 and 1880–81 seasons. The football club are first mentioned in 1876, however a cricket club of the same name existed at least a year earlier. 

In 1877 at a meeting held at The Walnut Tree, Wrexham, Mr F Jones was selected as club captain, with Mr J Grant as vice-captain. The following year Mr T Jones was captain, with Mr E Hopkins as vice-captain.

The club are last mentioned in 1893, and are presumed to have folded around this time. They played their home fixtures at Mr Snape's Field, Chester Road, Wrexham.

Cup History

Notable players
  Arthur Lea – Wales Football International.
  Harry Trainer – Wales Football International.
  James Trainer – Wales Football International.

References

Sport in Wrexham
Sport in Wrexham County Borough
Defunct football clubs in Wales
Football clubs in Wrexham